Howard David Hermansdorfer (April 11, 1931 – November 17, 2003) was a United States district judge of the United States District Court for the Eastern District of Kentucky.

Education and career

Born in Ashland, Kentucky, Hermansdorfer received an Artium Baccalaureus degree from Princeton University in 1953 and a Bachelor of Laws from the University of Virginia School of Law in 1959. He was in private practice in Ashland from 1959 to 1972.

Federal judicial service

On February 16, 1972, Hermansdorfer was nominated by President Richard Nixon to a new seat on the United States District Court for the Eastern District of Kentucky created by 84 Stat. 294. He was confirmed by the United States Senate on March 2, 1972, and received his commission on March 7, 1972. Hermansdorfer served in that capacity until his resignation on January 31, 1981.

Death

Hermansdorfer died on November 17, 2003, in Ashland.

References

Sources
 

1931 births
2003 deaths
Judges of the United States District Court for the Eastern District of Kentucky
United States district court judges appointed by Richard Nixon
20th-century American judges